Margaret Christl is a Scottish-Canadian folksinger. Christl was born in England, grew up in Scotland and West Wales and emigrated to Canada in 1966. She became active in the folk revival scene, playing many folk festivals, including the Mariposa Folk Festival, Edmonton Folk Festival and the Calgary Folk Music Festival, as well as the club and coffeehouse circuit. She has released a number of albums with different folk labels, including The Barley grain for me. This album was recorded with Ian Robb and William Laskin in 1976 with Folk-Legacy Records and was dedicated to Edith Fowke, a very important scholar, folklorist and collector of folk music in Canada. Christl performs traditional Scottish and Canadian songs, as well as more contemporary songs. She is often accompanied by guitarists, but also plays the mountain dulcimer and the Bodhrán. Christl frequently performed with Ian Robb, Grit (William) Laskin and Stewart Cameron.

References

Other Resources
Archival recording of Margaret Christl at the Mariposa Festival in 1975
Program for a performance at a house concert in Berkley.

Canadian folk musicians
Living people
Musicians from Toronto
Year of birth missing (living people)
Waterbug Records artists